The 1994 African Cup of Nations was the 19th edition of the Africa Cup of Nations, the association football championship of Africa (CAF). It was hosted by Tunisia, who replaced original hosts Zaire. Just as in 1992, the field of twelve teams was split into four groups of three. Nigeria won its second championship, beating Zambia 2–1 in the final.

The Zambian team was recently formed, following an air disaster in which eighteen players and several staff members of the previous team had been killed.

Qualified teams 

The 12 qualified teams are:

  (holders)
 
 
 
 
 
 
  *
 
  (host)
 
 

* Senegal replaced Algeria (disqualified)

Squads

Venues

First round 
Teams highlighted in green progress to the Quarter Finals.

Group A

Group B

Group C

Group D

Knockout stage

Quarterfinals

Semifinals

Third place match

Final

Scorers 
5 goals
  Rashidi Yekini

4 goals
  Joël Tiéhi

2 goals

  Bashir Abdel Samad
  Charles Akonnor
  Michel Bassolé
  Emmanuel Amuneke
  Elijah Litana
  Kenneth Malitoli

1 goal

  Hamza El-Gamal
  Ayman Mansour
  Prince Polley
  Aboubacar Titi Camara
  Tchiressoua Guel
  Adama Koné
  Ahmed Ouattara
  Donald-Olivier Sie
  Abdoulaye Traoré
  Fernand Coulibaly
  Amadou Diallo
  Modibo Sidibé
  Soumaila Traoré
  Mutiu Adepoju
  Ben Iroha
  Momath Gueye
  Athanas Tendeng
  Faouzi Rouissi
  Lemba Basaula
  Nsumbu Ngoy
  Kalusha Bwalya
  Zeddy Saileti
  Evans Sakala

CAF Team of the Tournament 
Goalkeeper
  Ahmed Shobair

Defenders
  Frank Amankwah
  Harrison Chongo
  Elijah Litana
  Benedict Iroha

Midfielders
  Serge-Alain Maguy
  Jay-Jay Okocha
  Daniel Amokachi
  Abedi Pele

Forwards
  Joël Tiéhi
  Rashidi Yekini

External links 

 Details at RSSSF
 Details at www.angelfire.com

 
African Cup of Nations, 1994
African Cup of Nations
Africa Cup of Nations tournaments
Nations
African Cup of Nations
African Cup of Nations
Sports competitions in Tunis
African Cup of Nations, 1994